The Moonies were an alternative rock band from Liverpool, England, who existed from 2001 to 2005.

Members
Steve Banks (Vocals/guitar)
Ryan Clarke (Vocals/bass)
Mike Berry (Drums)
Steve Charmley (Guitarist)

History
Steve Banks, Ryan Clarke and Mike Berry were teenagers when they first began playing. Steve and Ryan recorded an album as The Moggs in 2000 with drummer Chris Marooth for Foulplay Records and a UK tour to promote the album went ahead with Mike on drums, although the record label and band agreed to pull out of the recording contract.  In 2001, they changed their name to The Moonies, a name inspired by Banks' affection and admiration of Keith Moon and were signed by Plastic Boot Records under the music management company Tri-Tone and Music Publisher EMI. They released several singles in the UK in 2002 and 2003, and played shows alongside popular bands including The Libertines, Juliette & The Licks, The Kaiser Chiefs and The Subways.  
The Moonies also toured the country several times with Buzzcocks and recorded a song featuring the vocals of Buzzcocks' singer Pete Shelley, although the track was never officially released.
Guitarist Steve Charmley joined the band in 2004 when the band made their way down to London to record new tracks for EMI, including the song featuring Pete Shelley.
Their album "It's Amazing!" was released in Japan in December 2003.  Unfortunately, Steve Banks left the group in 2005 and The Moonies disbanded.

Albums

Sweetcorn & Soft Porn (as The Moggs)
Produced by Lance Thomas
CD (FP0001):
"Drop Us A Line"
"A Week From Today"
"Sweetcorn & Soft Porn"
"All In One Day"
"Colin"
"Hard To Miss"
"Blockbuster"
"Arthur Browne"
"Get It Together"
"Buried In Me"
"Wake Up In Bed"
"When I Die"

It's Amazing!
Release Date: 12 December 2003 (Japan)
Produced by Lance Thomas
CD (VJR-011):
"Get Busy"
"I Would Give It All Up For Your Love"
"Love Me"
"Last Summer"
"Go"
"Simple"
"Blue"
"Big City"
"Forever"
"Cool"
"The Record Store"
"Long Long Time"

Singles and EPs

Blue
Release Date: 13 May 2002
7" (PB002):
"Blue"
"So Good"
CD (PBCD002):
"Blue"
"So Good"

Cool
Release Date: 12 August 2002
7" (PB003):
"Cool"
"Stars In Heaven"
CD (PBCD003):
"Cool"
"Stars In Heaven"

I Would Give It All Up For Your Love
Release Date: 5 May 2003
7" (PB004):
"I Would Give It All Up For Your Love"
"I Like You"
CD (PBCD004):
"I Would Give It All Up For Your Love"
"I Like You"
"Simple" (Demo)

The Rock And Roll EP
Release Date: 8 December 2003
Notes: Produced by Gordon Raphael. A fourth song, "Overload", was included on the CD-R promotional copies of the EP.
7" (PB005):
"Being Me"
"Teenage Suicide"
"Record Store"

Reviews and Press Quotes
"In eye catching black and white font, the words on the cover of The Moonies debut release ‘Blue’ succinctly states ‘Who the F*@k are the Moonies’. The Moonies are a three piece who hail from The Beatles end of Liverpool, but if you’re expecting their location to be obvious in their sound, then you’re going to be disappointed. Taking their cues from the antics of Keith Moon and the sound of The Who and Ash, The Moonies are a hedonistic hit band waiting to happen. 'Blue' is melodic rock with Americana vocals that repeat ‘I’m so blue, without you’ over pop chords and a cute use of scratching to cover swearing. 'So Good', meanwhile, is a three-minute whirlwind of Buzzcocks guitar and lilting harmonies that belong in your finest emo effort. You may not have heard of the Moonies yet, but judging by the exuberance and pop sensibilities of their debut, you’ll be hearing of them in the future. — 7/10" — Natalie Boxall, BBC Manchester, 13 May 2002

Cool is precisely what the Moonies are not. Squeezed into their tight two tone sta-prest suits and black rollnecked sweaters, they sing about "Getting out of Liverpool" when you know they actually only have a day trip to Runcorn in them. The tune itself is actually ok, all bobbing heads and cheery chorus and I dare say they are good fun live so let's try not be too harsh, eh." — Mawders, SoundsXP.com, September 2002
"Evil bastards, The Moonies. Coming from the same area of Liverpool as The Beatles they're the self-proclaimed new Messiahs of jangle pop, promising the one true path to a world of peace, purity, free love and Oasis. But beware: once Blue‚ has lured you out of the shopping centre by sounding like something pleasant off Definitely Maybe‚ for a bit, it'll brainwash you with piledriving My Bloody Valentine guitars, a hypnotic chorus and breaking stereo noises until you're a slavering, unquestioning believer doing the conga down Oxford Street in an orange sheet to it. Oh, and join the fanclub and you get 20 wives by return of post. And you will join, won't you? You will join. No, you will join." - Mark Beaumont, NME 

"Whether or not these raucous Liverpool teens ever make it big or not, it sounds like they'll have fun along the way. This debut comprises two sharp, energetic little frenzies with memorable hooks, frenetic drumming and several edgy tangents." - The Independent on Saturday (Single Of The Week) 

"Liverpudlians. The Moonies have nothing in common with all those psychedelic scallywags making weird and wonderful music on the northwest frontier. Not that this isn't wonderful. A barely two-minute blast of energy-added racket, it's full of the unabashed thrills of being in a band: "we could be so cool/we could get out of Liverpool" and, having already completed their first wish, the second can't be far behind. This will spectacularly warp naive young minds. Good las." — NME, 24 August 2002

"The Moonies. So angry their records actually break your stereo. The Moonies are three psychotic, foul-mouthed turbo-bastard keith Moon wanbabes from the same part of Liverpool as the Beatles - where they've torn down the Thumbs Aloft School Of Immaculate Paul Macca Wackyness to make way for a military weapon testing site dedicated to blowing up Starsailor. Great tunes too." — NME, 20 April 2002

The Moonies Live, Dublin Castle, London: "Three young shavers from Liverpool who hardly look old enough to read, let alone vote, the Moonies play a predictable if appealing distillation of four decades of youth-club pop, almost desperate in their enthusiasm to reach the chorus. The tiny singer, Steve Banks, might not win any arm wrestling matches against apprentice jockeys, but since he has the looks of Edward Furlong that's likely to prove academic. Songs such as debut single, "Blue" and the catchy "Go" ('go-a-woah-a-woah') are nagging enough to show their promise." — Steve Jelbert, The Independent, May 2002

The Moonies Live, Leadimll, Sheffield: "It takes something solid to open a show for the mighty Buzzcocks and the Moonies - part of the Merseyside revival - offer something suitable for them this weekend.
Gearing up for the release of their third single, "I would give it all up for your love", the trio brandish an infectious and energetic sound which calls upon the golden days of Mod infused rock'n'roll to offer the same rawness of the Who and Small Faces.
With an average age of 19, the lads boast live inertia of a Supergrass of an Ash and are on this tour at Pete Shelley's bequest." — Sheffield Star, 9 March 2003

References

External links
Official home page
Another official home page
Band profile: The Moonies - Drowned in Sound
Interview in The Ruby Slippers Fanzine, July 2002
Review of "Blue"

English alternative rock groups
Musical groups from Liverpool